The biblical judges are described in the Hebrew Bible, and mostly in the Book of Judges, as people who served roles as military leaders in times of crisis, in the period before an Israelite monarchy was established.

Role

A cyclical pattern is regularly recounted in the Book of Judges to show the need for the various judges: apostasy of the Israelite people, hardship brought on as punishment from God, crying out to the Lord for rescue.

The story of the judges seems to describe successive individuals, each from a different tribe of Israel, described as chosen by God to rescue the people from their enemies and establish justice.

While judge is a literalistic translation of the Hebrew term shophet used in the Masoretic text, the position as described is more one of unelected non-hereditary leadership than that of legal pronouncement. However, Cyrus H. Gordon argued that they may have come from among the hereditary leaders of the fighting, landed and ruling aristocracy, like the kings (basileis) in Homer. Coogan says that they were most likely tribal or local leaders, contrary to the Deuteronomistic historian's portrayal of them as leaders of all of Israel, but Malamat pointed out that in the text, their authority is described as being recognized by local groups or tribes beyond their own.

Historicity and timeline

The biblical scholar Kenneth Kitchen argues that, from the conquest of Canaan by Joshua until the formation of the first Kingdom of Israel and Judah, the Israelite tribes may have formed a loose confederation. In this conception, no central government would have existed but in times of crisis, the people would have been led by ad hoc chieftains, known as judges (shoftim). However, some scholars are uncertain whether such a role existed in ancient Israel.

Working with the chronology in Judges, Payne points out that although the timescale of Judges is indicated by Jephthah's statement (Judges 11:26) that Israel had occupied the land for around 300 years, some of the judges overlapped one another.

Bill T. Arnold and H.G.M. Williamson wrote that if

There is also doubt among some scholars about any historicity of the Book of Judges.

Judges mentioned in the Hebrew Bible
In the Hebrew Bible, Moses is described as a shofet over the Israelites and appoints others to whom cases were delegated in accordance with the advice of Jethro, his Midianite father-in-law. The Book of Judges mentions twelve leaders who are said to "judge" Israel: Othniel, Ehud, Shamgar, Deborah, Gideon, Tola, Jair, Jephthah, Ibzan, Elon, Abdon, and Samson. Ehud, described in the text between Othniel and Shamgar, is usually included as a judge because the history of his leadership follows a set pattern characteristic of five of the others. The First Book of Samuel mentions Eli and Samuel, as well as Joel and Abiah (two sons of Samuel). The First Book of Chronicles mentions Kenaniah and his sons. The Second Book of Chronicles mentions Amariah and Zebadiah (son of Ishmael).

The Book of Judges also recounts the story of Abimelech, an illegitimate son of Gideon, who was appointed as a judge-like leader by the citizens of the city of Shechem.  He was later overthrown during a local conflict, and the classification of Abimelech as a judge is questionable.

The biblical text does not generally describe these leaders as "a judge", but says that they "judged Israel", using the verb שָׁפַט (š-f-t). Thus, Othniel "judged Israel" (Judges 3:10), Tola "judged Israel twenty-three years" (Judges 10:2), and Jair judged Israel twenty-two years (Judges 10:3).

According to the Book of Judges, Deborah (Dəḇōrā, "bee") was a prophetess of the God of the Israelites, the fourth Judge of pre-monarchic Israel and the only female judge mentioned in the Bible.

See also

 Shophet
 Judges in the Book of Mormon

Notes

References

Bibliography

 
 
 
 
 
 <br/ >This article incorporates text from this public-domain publication.

Further reading

 
Titles of national or ethnic leadership